The Llanos Basin or Eastern Llanos Basin is a major sedimentary basin of  in northeastern Colombia. The onshore foreland on Mesozoic rift basin covers the departments of Arauca, Casanare and Meta and parts of eastern Boyacá and Cundinamarca, western Guainía, northern Guaviare and southeasternmost Norte de Santander. The northern boundary is formed by the border with Venezuela, where the basin grades into the Barinas-Apure Basin.

Description 
The northeastern part of Colombia is characterized by its wavy plains, called Llanos Orientales, as part of the bigger Llanos that extend into Venezuela. The landscape is similar to a savanna and is poor in trees. It is located between the Eastern Ranges of the Colombian Andes in the west, the Vaupés Arch in the south and the Guiana Shield in the east.

Geologically, the Llanos Basin underlies this typical landscape of the Llanos. An area where transport occurs mostly by small boats along the many rivers and the "buses of the Llanos", the Douglas DC-3 planes. Several of the formations in the basins are source rocks (Gachetá, Los Cuervos, Carbonera C8), reservoir rocks (Mirador, Barco, Guadalupe and the uneven numbered members of Carbonera). Seals are formed by the shaly intervals (even numbered) of the Carbonera Formation, Los Cuervos, and León.

The basin is the main petroleum producing basin of Colombia, with four of the nations biggest oil fields located in the Llanos Basin. Major fields are Rubiales, Colombia's biggest and most recent giant discovery sealed by a complex of hydrodynamic processes, and Caño Limón, at the border with Venezuela.

Major concerns in the basin for the production of petroleum are biodegradation, hydrocarbon migration, fault seal capacity and water flow.

Hydrography 

The Llanos Basin is crossed by numerous rivers, all belonging to the Orinoco watershed. From north to south:

 Arauca River
 Bojabá
 Margua
 Orinoco River
 Capanaparo
 Cinaruco
 Tomo
 Elvita
 Bita
 Meta River
 Casanare
 Cravo Norte
 Ele
 Tame
 Ariporo
 La Fortaleza
 Guachiría
 Pauto
 Cravo Sur
 Cusiana
 Upía
 Guavio
 Lengupá
 Guatiquía
 Manacacías
 Metica
 Guayuriba
 Guaviare River
 Ariarí
 Güejar
 Guayabero
 Duda
 Losada
 Uvá
 Siare
 Vichada River
 Muco
 Tillava

Flora and fauna

Fauna 

Among other species, Lynch's swamp frog (Pseudopaludicola llanera) is endemic to the Llanos, with the species epithet referring to the plains. Also the whip scorpion Mastigoproctus colombianus is reported from the Llanos Basin.

Geodynamic situation 

The country of Colombia spreads out over six tectonic plates, clockwise from north:
 Caribbean Plate
 North Andes Plate
 South American Plate
 Malpelo Plate
 Coiba Plate
 Panama Plate

The Llanos Basin is situated entirely on the South American Plate, bordering the North Andean Block or North Andean microplate in the west. The basin is one of three Colombian basins on the South American Plate, to the south the Caguán-Putumayo Basin and to the southeast the Vaupés-Amazonas Basin. The northern boundary of the Llanos Basin is formed by the Colombia-Venezuela border where the basin grades into the Barinas-Apure Basin on the Venezuelan side. The Catatumbo Basin, representing the Colombian portion of the larger Maracaibo Basin borders the Llanos Basin in the northwest and the western boundary is formed by the foothills (Piedemonte) of the Eastern Cordillera Basin, the sedimentary basin covering the Eastern Ranges of the Colombian Andes.

Tectonics 

The fault system has an average strike of 042.1±19, but this orientation varies greatly along its course. The 1827, 1834, 1917, 1967, 1995, and 2008 earthquakes were all caused by fault movement as part of the system.

Basin history 

The tectonic history of the Llanos Basin, a foreland basin formed on top of Mesozoic rift basins, Paleozoic metasediments and Precambrian basement underlain by continental crust, goes back to the Early Jurassic.

The Andean orogeny, represented by the tectonic uplift of the Colombian Eastern Ranges and its northern extension, the Serranía del Perijá, caused tilting and uplift in the Llanos Basin. In the Late Miocene to Pliocene, the major faults to the southwest of the Cocinetas Basin, the Oca and Bucaramanga-Santa Marta Faults were tectonically active.

Basement 

The stratigraphy of the Llanos Basin ranges, depending on the definition from either Jurassic or Paleozoic to recent. The basement is formed by the westernmost extensions of the Guiana Shield. Remnants of these Precambrian formations are found as inselbergs in the far east of Colombia (Cerros de Mavecure), in the Serranía de la Macarena to the southwest of the basin and in the tepuis of the Serranía de Chiribiquete to the southeast.

The Proterozoic crystalline rocks are overlain by metamorphosed sedimentary and igneous rocks ranging in age from Cambrian to Devonian. Younger and contemporaneous Paleozoic deposits are only found in the subsurface and in regional correlative units as the Floresta and Cuche Formations of the Altiplano Cundiboyacense to the direct northwest and the Río Cachirí Group of the Cesar-Ranchería Basin farther northwest of the Llanos Basin.

The units found in the Llanos Basin pertain to the Farallones Group and comprise the Valle del Guatiquía Red Beds, Pipiral Shale and the Gutiérrez Sandstone.

Stratigraphy

Paleozoic 
Cambro-Ordovician
 Guape Formation
 Duda Formation
 Ariarí Formation
 Ariarí Metagabbro

Pre-Devonian
 Quetame Group
 Río Guamal Metasiltstones
 Guayabetal Phyllites and Quartzites
 San Cristóbal Quartzites and Phyllites
 Susumuco Metaconglomerates and Phyllites

Devonian
 Farallones Group
 Valle del Guatiquía Red Beds
 Pipiral Shale
 Gutiérrez Sandstone

Jurassic 
 Buenavista Breccia

Petroleum geology 
The Llanos Basin is the most prolific hydrocarbon basin of Colombia, hosting well-known petroleum deposits as Caño Limón, Rubiales and other fields. Nine of the twenty most producing oil fields of Colombia are situated in the Llanos Basin.

Fields 
Based on data released in March 2018, Colombia is the 21st oil producer in the world. In 2016, twenty oilfields produced 66% of all oil of Colombia, listed below in bold.

Major oil fields in the Llanos Basin are:

 Other fields
 Caño Verde
 Chaparrito
 Concesión
 Corcel
 Cravo Sur
 La Gloria
 Santiago
 Trinidad
 Valdivia

Mining 
Mining activities in the Llanos Basin are restricted to certain areas, resulting in less conflicts, more common with indigenous peoples in the Amazonian part of Colombia.
 gold
 halite
 coal

In San José del Guaviare platinum is mined.

Paleontology 

Compared to many fossiliferous formations in Colombia, the Llanos Basin has been lean in fossil content. Most of the basin stratigraphy is only known from wells.

Paleozoic outcrops surrounding and perforating the planar geography have provided fossils dating back to the Cambrian; the Duda and Ariarí Formations.

Several fossiliferous formations of contemporaneous depositional environments have provided many unique fossils indicative of paleoclimatic conditions; turtle fossils were described from Los Cuervos in the Cesar-Ranchería Basin, and the Mirador Formation in the Catatumbo Basin direct northwest of the Llanos Basin has provided many fossil flora.

Other correlative units with surrounding basins
 Guayabo - Sabana and Soatá, Ware, Honda
 León - Honda
 Carbonera - Barzalosa, Castilletes, Jimol
 Mirador - Bogotá - Etayoa
 Los Cuervos - Cerrejón - Titanoboa, crocodylians, turtles, flora
 Los Cuervos - Guaduas - fossil flora
 Gachetá - Chipaque - oysters
 Gachetá - La Luna - many
 Une - Hiló - ammonites
 Farallones Group - Floresta and Cuche

See also 
 Sedimentary basins of Colombia
 Cesar-Ranchería Basin
 Cocinetas Basin
 Middle Magdalena Valley
 Neuquén Basin, major petroleum producing basin of Argentina
 Santos Basin, major petroleum producing basin of Brazil
 Eastern Venezuela Basin, primary petroleum producing basin of Venezuela

Sources

Notes

References

Bibliography

General

Hydrodynamics

Tectonics

Petroleum

Paleontology

Reports

Maps 
 

Departmental
 
 
 

Local

Further reading 
 
 
 

Sedimentary basins of Colombia
Foreland basins
Rift basins
Cenozoic Colombia
Mesozoic Colombia
Paleozoic Colombia

Basins
Basins
Basins
Basins
Basins
Basins
Basins
Colombia–Venezuela border
Oil and Natural Gas Corporation
ONGC oil and gas fields